Rolan Adams (21 March 1975 – 21 February 1991) was a Black British boy who was murdered as the result of a racist hate crime which was committed in 1991. He is frequently associated in connection to Stephen Lawrence, another teenager from a neighboring area in Southeast London, who was later killed in a similar incident. The death of these teenagers influenced the public view of racially motivated attacks in Southeast London, England at the time. Their deaths also influenced activist movements in other areas, including the United States.

Rolan's background 
Those who knew Rolan described him as a good student, dedicated football player, and talented musician. At the time of his death at age 15, Rolan was preparing to take his pre-university exams, had been scouted by a professional football club, West Ham United, and was working on recording original music he wrote. Rolan's family moved to Abbey Wood, an area in Southeast London, five years prior to his death. At the time of the crime, Rolan was responsible for taking care of his younger brother, Nathan, and his younger sister, Lauren, while his parents were at work.

Societal context 

Thamesmead, where Rolan was murdered, was predominately populated by white families with some Asian and Caribbean families scattered throughout. The immigration of black people to England increased in general in the late 1940's and 1950's, leading to racial tensions in the following decades. In the areas around Thamesmead, certain housing policies were put in place which favored white people and created a hostile environment for people of color. Reported racially-motivated violence in Southeast London was increasing in the 1990's, and Thamesmead itself had started to develop a reputation for being "racially charged." This is also in part due to the headquarters of the far-right British Nationalist Party being in nearby Welling. The extremist party had a reputation for fascist or racist ideologies, encouraging that kind of behavior in those with aligning views. Adolescent gangs with these views developed in areas throughout Southeast London depending on how the land was naturally divided. These often dangerous groups grew between the 1980's and 1990's. One main gang called the Goldfish was also known as the NTOs, Natty Turn-Outs, and then later evolved into the Nazi Turn-Outs. This group is attributed as being Rolan's assailants.

Murder details 
On Friday 21 February 1991, Rolan Adams and his brother Nathan, fifteen and fourteen-years-old, respectively, were unknowingly being followed as they were walking from Thamesmead's multicultural Hawksmoor Youth Centre. They had finished playing table tennis and were walking towards a bus stop to get to their home in Abbey Wood, Southeast London. Upon arrival at the bus stop, they were surrounded by a large group of 12-15 older white youth, members of the NTOs, who had been drinking at the Wildfowler Pub. While Rolan and Nathan were being harassed and racially abused, one gang member, nineteen-year-old Mark Thornborrow, stabbed Rolan in the neck with a butterfly knife. In an attempt to flee, Rolan started to run while yelling at Nathan to run as well. The two got separated. The gang members were chasing and yelling profanities and racial slurs at them, including, "'niggers'". Nathan managed to escape, but Rolan shortly collapsed and died after. When Nathan returned to the bus stop, he saw his brother dead.

Case and trial 
From the start of the trial, there was hesitation to admit that the crime was racially motivated. The police and the CPS (Crown Prosecution Service) instead determined that the crime was a battle over gang territory. Nathan and Rolan were not seen as victims but identified as guilty parties by the police, because of what some believed to be the racist stereotype that "Black boys cannot be innocent." As a result of this harmful generalization, Nathan was treated poorly by the authorities. Although he was also attacked, none of the gang members were prosecuted for assaulting him. Eight of the youth that were participants of the murder were arrested on charges of violent disorder. Only Mark Thornborrow stood trial, was charged, and convicted of murder. The sentencing judge, Judge Kenneth Richardson, eventually concluded that the murder was racially motivated and sentenced Mark Thornborrow accordingly.

Adams family response 

Rolan's family expressed that local officials and authorities displayed a lack of support following his murder. Rolan's family were received threatening phone calls where some individuals were gloating about Rolan's death. At one point, they received a letter with the message, "glad a nigger is dead." The harassment of the Adams and their friends and family were getting extreme, and there was an absence of any police protection. Eventually, the local authorities and the local Commission for Racial Equality advised them that they were in danger. That night, three months following the murder, they left their home. The Adams family also claimed to have been under surveillance by the British police. Richard, Audrey, and Nathan Adams were all later involved with The Undercover Policing Inquiry. This effort against the High Court of England aimed to bring to light and seek justice for the fact that the British police were spying on victims of crime and their families. Audrey Adams in one interview described their experience and the way they were treated as "horrific."

As a result of the injustices they experienced, Rolan's mother and father, Richard and Audrey, as well as extended family and friends created the Rolan Adams Family Campaign to ensure justice. This campaign grew over the years and extended support to other victims of racist violence and racism. Moreover, it contributed to shutting down the British National Party's headquarters in Welling. Police did not like the campaign and were hostile. They stopped friends and family from visiting the Adams for months. Despite opposition and in an effort to keep Rolan's memory alive, a tradition of holding a candlelit vigil where Rolan was murdered on the anniversary of his death was established by his family. Individuals would pray silently and lay wreaths in Rolan's memory. However, this ended in 2001 when the mourners were being harassed. Spectators were known to sound their car horns, and one individual threw a McDonald's milkshake at them as they were standing silently.

Societal outcomes and related incidents 
The black American activist, Reverend Al Sharpton, came to London to hold a meeting in support of the Adams family. However, the fascist British National Party (BNP) used the situation to their advantage and marched through Thamesmead and attacked the meeting. Reverend Sharpton's efforts were met with mixed responses from local black rights activists. It also brought more media attention to Rolan's murder.

The UK Parliament responded later to Rolan's murder by bringing up a motion on his behalf on February 16, 1993. This motion was an effort to send condolences to his family and also to start discussion for a memorial for victims of racial violence. No amendments were officially submitted as a result.

Two years after the death of Rolan Adams, the death of another black youth, Stephen Lawrence, happened on 22 April 1993. He and his friend, Duwayne Brooks, were together that afternoon and were headed home. They arrived at the bus stop in Well Hall road at about 10:30pm. Stephen went to check to see if the bus was coming and he was in a position where he was standing in the middle of the entrance of Dickson road. Duwayne was standing between Dickson road and the roundabout when he saw a group of five or six white youths. He asked Stephen if he saw the bus coming. One of the white youths heard something Duwayne said and shouted, "what, what nigger?" The group then proceeded to run towards Duwayne and Stephen. At this time, either one or more of the white youths stabbed Stephen twice. Durwayne called out to Stephen to run and follow him. He ran towards Shooters Hill and Stephen managed to get on his feet and run over one hundred yards to the point where he collapsed. Stephen had stab wounds on both sides of his body, on the chest and arm, to a depth of about five inches. Both stab wounds had severed axillary arteries. His death had several similarities to Rolan's but was more widely publicized.

References 

Adams, Rolan
Racially motivated violence in the United Kingdom
Racially motivated violence against black people